Ingrid Noll (married name Ingrid Gullatz, born 29 September 1935 in Shanghai) is a German thriller writer. She has written several novels, including Head Count (Die Häupter meiner Lieben), Hell Hath No Fury (Der Hahn ist tot) and The Pharmacist (Die Apothekerin), as well as one television drama, Bommels Billigflüge. Several of her novels have been subsequently adapted as films, including Die Apothekerin, which was released in the United States as The Pharmacist and was nominated for the German Film Award in Gold for outstanding feature film. She published her first novel, which became a great success, at the age of 55. Today she is one of the most popular German female authors.

Filmography
The Pharmacist, directed by Rainer Kaufmann (1997, based on Die Apothekerin)
, directed by Hans-Günther Bücking (1999, based on Die Häupter meiner Lieben)
Der Hahn ist tot, directed by Hermine Huntgeburth (2000, TV film, based on Der Hahn ist tot)
Kalt ist der Abendhauch, directed by Rainer Kaufmann (2000, based on Kalt ist der Abendhauch)
Vater aus Liebe, directed by Imogen Kimmel (2008, TV film, based on a novel by Ingrid Noll)
Ladylike – Jetzt erst recht!, directed by Vanessa Jopp (2009, TV film, based on Ladylike)

Screenwriter
Bommels Billigflüge (1993, TV film)

References

External links

 
 Ingrid Noll  in NRW Literatur im Netz 

German thriller writers
German crime fiction writers
Recipients of the Order of Merit of Baden-Württemberg
1935 births
Living people
German women novelists
Women thriller writers